Parke Heritage High School is a public high school in Rockville, Indiana that opened in the 2018-19 School Year as a result of the consolidation of former North Central Parke County, Indiana high schools, Rockville and Turkey Run.

About
Parke Heritage High School was created from the consolidation of former high schools in North Central Parke County, Indiana, Rockville, and Turkey Run.

The school's fight song was composed by Ashley Brown, who taught at Parke Heritage for two years. She combined elements of the two schools' songs plus other elements.

Campus
Parke Heritage High School uses the  campus of the former Rockville Junior-Senior High School. There is a football field located on the school's campus. The baseball/softball fields are not on the school's campus. There is also a track around the football field that is used on multiple occasions.

Curriculum
The Parke Heritage Wolves have a spell bowl team, a math bowl team, and many other academic teams. Their spell bowl team went to state on their inaugural year. Parke Heritage High also has a band and a choir, whose members participate in Solo and Ensemble annually. Parke Heritage is a member of the Rural Early College Network, offering dual-credit classes to students.

Athletics
The Parke Heritage Wolves compete in 9 varsity sports including baseball, basketball, cheerleading, cross country, football, golf, softball, track & field, tennis, and volleyball. The teams retained membership in Rockville and Turkey Run's athletic conference, the Wabash River Conference.

IHSAA Tournament Success
- In the 2020-2021 Boys Basketball season, the wolves were Class 2A runners up. Parke Heritage finished with a 27-4 record.

See also
 List of high schools in Indiana

Rockville Junior-Senior High School (Indiana)

Turkey Run High School

References

External links
 Official website

Public high schools in Indiana
Education in Parke County, Indiana
Buildings and structures in Parke County, Indiana